Bardala labarda is the only species in the monotypic genus Bardala, a member of the comb-footed spider family Theridiidae. It was first described by Michael I. Saaristo in 2006, and is endemic to the coral atoll of Aldabra.

See also
 List of Theridiidae species

References

Spiders of Africa
Spiders described in 1983
Theridiidae